The  is the official document after the Armistice of Villa Giusti with which General Armando Diaz, the supreme commander of the Royal Italian Army, announced, on November 4, 1918, the surrender of the Austro-Hungarian Empire and the victory of the Kingdom of Italy in World War I.

Legacy
Its material author was, in reality, general Domenico Siciliani, head of the press office of the supreme command. Every year, Italian institutions celebrate the event with National Unity and Armed Forces Day on November 4.

The , together with the address to the navy by Paolo Thaon di Revel, is a symbol of the Italian victory in World War I. Commemorative plaques with the text are exposed in every town hall and military barracks of Italy that are fused using the bronze of enemy artillery pieces.

A similar bulletin was never drafted for the air forces since they were part of the Aeronautical Service, a department dedicated to Royal Italian Army aircraft: the Royal Air Force, the third armed force of the Kingdom of Italy, was established only in 1923, after the end of the war.

Text

Italian

English
From the Supreme Headquarters 12:00 hours, November 4, 1918

The war against Austria-Hungary, which the Italian Army, inferior in number and equipment, began on 24 May 1915 under the leadership of His Majesty and supreme leader the King and conducted with unwavering faith and tenacious bravery without rest for 41 months, is won.

The gigantic battle, which opened on the 24th of last October and in which fifty-one Italian divisions, three British, two French, one Czechoslovak and a US regiment joined against seventy-three Austrian divisions, is over.

The lightning-fast and most audacious advance of the XXIX Army Corps on Trento, blocking the retreat of the enemy armies from Trentino, as they were overwhelmed from the west by the troops of the VII army and from the east by those of the I, VI, and the IV armies, led to the utter collapse of the enemy's front. From the Brenta to the Torre, the fleeing enemy is pushed ever further back by the irresistible onslaught of the XII, VIII, X Armies and of the cavalry divisions.

In the plains, His Royal Highness the Duke of Aosta is advancing at the head of his undefeated III Army, eager to return to the previously successfully conquered positions, which they had never lost.

The Austro-Hungarian Army is vanquished: it suffered terrible losses in the dogged resistance of the early days, and during the pursuit it lost an enormous quantity of materials of every kind as well as almost all its stockpiles and supply depots. The Austro-Hungarian Army has so far left about 300,000 prisoners of war in our hands along with multiple entire officer corps and at least 5,000 pieces of artillery.

The remnants of what was one of the world's most powerful armies are returning in hopelessness and chaos up the valleys from which they had descended with boastful confidence.

Chief of Staff of the Army, General Diaz

See also
Bollettino della Vittoria Navale

References

External links

The whole Bulletin in the Italian version, with a brief explanation from Italian Army website
A video with the voice of Diaz reading the address

National symbols of Italy
Italian front (World War I)
1918 in Italy
1918 documents